The 1985 Sacramento State Hornets football team represented California State University, Sacramento as a member of the Western Football Conference (WFC) during the 1985 NCAA Division II football season. Led by eighth-year head coach Bob Mattos, Sacramento State compiled an overall record of 8–3 with a mark of 4–1 in conference play, placing second in the WFC. The team outscored its opponents 326 to 229 for the season. The Hornets played home games at Hornet Stadium in Sacramento, California.

1985 was the first year Sacramento State competed in the WFC. They had been a member of the Northern California Athletic Conference (NCAC) from 1954 to 1984.

Schedule

Team players in the NFL
The following Sacramento State players were selected in the 1986 NFL Draft.

References

Sacramento State
Sacramento State Hornets football seasons
Sacramento State Hornets football